Patricia Falken Smith (January 21, 1926 – May 19, 2001) was a television writer, best known for her being head writer of several soap operas, including General Hospital and Days of Our Lives.

Positions held
Where the Heart Is
 Head Writer: 1970-1972

Days of Our Lives
Head Writer: May 1975 - April 19, 1977, October 21, 1981 - April 16, 1982
Script Writer: 1966, 1968-1971, 1972-1975
Story Consultant: 1987-1988

General Hospital
Head Writer: 1979-1981, 1985-1986, 1988-1989

Guiding Light
Head Writer: 1982-1983

Ryan's Hope
Head Writer: 1983-1985

Career
Smith served as head writer for Days of our Lives from 1975 - 1977, where she earned a salary of $285,000 a year, considered very high for that time, which included $35,000 just for "thinking creatively." She won the "Outstanding Writing in a Drama Series" Daytime Emmy Award for Days of our Lives in 1976 and 1977. She returned to Days of our Lives in 1981 where she introduced the Brady and DiMera families.

Smith succeeded Douglas Marland as head writer of ABC Daytime's General Hospital from 1979 to 1981. With Smith as writer and Gloria Monty as producer, the show remained at the top of the daytime ratings roster. Smith was reported to be the highest paid writer in broadcasting history when she left General Hospital in 1981, at $1 million per year.

Smith then went to Guiding Light in 1982, where she again succeeded Marland as head writer. Her stint at GL was short, lasting only one cycle of 13 weeks. She went on to serve as head writer of Ryan's Hope before returning as head writer of General Hospital two more times in the 1980s. (1985-1986, 1988-1989). She died in Los Angeles, on May 19, 2001, aged 75.

Awards and nominations
Daytime Emmy Awards

WINS
(1976; Best Writing; Days of Our Lives)

NOMINATIONS 
(1975, 1977 & 1978; Best Writing; Days of Our Lives)
(1981 & 1986; Best Writing; General Hospital)

Writers Guild of America Award

NOMINATIONS 
(1975, 1976, 1977 & 1978 seasons; Days of Our Lives)

Notes and references

External links

 Obituary for Pat Falken Smith on SoapCentral

Genie Francis

American soap opera writers
1926 births
2001 deaths
American women television writers
Daytime Emmy Award winners
Place of birth missing
Women soap opera writers
20th-century American screenwriters
20th-century American women writers